The Catholic Church in Montenegro is part of the worldwide Catholic Church, under the spiritual leadership of the Pope in Rome. There are 21,299 Catholics in Montenegro, and they form three and a half percent of the population. Most Catholics are ethnic Albanians, Montenegrins and Croats.

The Apostolic Nuncio to Montenegro and to Bosnia and Herzegovina is Archbishop Francis Chullikatt.

Organisation

Latin Church Catholics
Within Montenegro the Latin Church Catholic hierarchy consists of the Archdiocese of Bar. The Diocese of Kotor is geographically located in Montenegro, but it is administratively part of the church in Croatia and is subject to the Archdiocese of Split-Makarska of that country. The territory of the Diocese of Kotor (Venetian: Cattaro) corresponds to the territory of Albania Veneta of the Republic of Venice, lost to Napoleon I in 1797 (Albania Veneta was mostly Catholic).

Eastern Catholics 

There are very few Greek Catholics of Montenegro, and no diocese. The Greek Catholics are assigned to the pastoral care of the Latin-rite clergy of the Catholic Church in Montenegro.

Demographics 
According to the 2011 official census, of the total 21,299 Catholics in Montenegro, there are:
 7,954 Albanians (37.34%)
 5,667 Montenegrins (26.61%)
 5,527 Croats (25.95%)
 2,151 others (10.01%)

The highest concentration of Catholics is in the Diocese of Kotor, covering coastal areas long under Venetian influence and largely made up of Croat Catholics. The rest of Montenegro is covered by the Archdiocese of Bar, in which there were a total of 12,165 Catholics, mainly Albanian Catholics, in 2006, in the following settlements:
 Tuzi - 4, 510
 Podgorica - 1,738
 Bar - 1,610
 Ulcinj - 947
 Štoj - 491
 Bratica - 475
 Hoti - 440
 Koja - 404
 Sveti Đorđe - 251
 Trieshi - 249
 Gruda - 232
 Kolonza - 219
 Zupci - 180
 Cetinje - 165
 Gusinje - 80
 Klezna - 91
 Ljara - 41
 Nikšić - 30
 Šestan - 12

See also 
Religion in Montenegro
Eastern Catholic Churches

References

Sources

External links

 http://www.catholic-hierarchy.org/country/dme.html

 
Montenegro